The 1979 Chicago Cubs season was the 108th season of the Chicago Cubs franchise, the 104th in the National League and the 64th at Wrigley Field, and the first to be beamed via satellite and cable television to viewers all over the United States on WGN Television, thanks to a postseason decision by the company management to uplink its broadcast signals via satellite with the help of Oklahoma-based United Video Satellite Group, making them the pioneer superstation in the country's midwest and the Cubs games of that season the third superstation baseball broadcasts live via satellite relay after the Braves and the Yankees. It was the first season of over 40 to be broadcast all over the county, slowly making the team a national brand. The Cubs finished fifth in the National League East with a record of 80–82.

Offseason 
 October 26, 1978: Rudy Meoli was released by the Cubs.
 February 23, 1979: Manny Trillo, Greg Gross, and Dave Rader were traded by the Cubs to the Philadelphia Phillies for Barry Foote, Ted Sizemore, Jerry Martin, Derek Botelho, and Henry Mack (minors).
 March 20, 1979: The Cubs traded a player to be named later to the Detroit Tigers for Steve Dillard. The Cubs completed the deal by sending Ed Putman to the Tigers on March 24.

Regular season 
On May 17, the Phillies beat the Cubs 23–22 at Wrigley Field in ten innings, with a 30-mph wind blowing out to left field. This was only the second time since 1913 that both teams scored 20 or more runs in a game, the only previous instance also being a Cubs–Phillies game.

Season standings

Record vs. opponents

Notable transactions 
 May 23, 1979: Ray Burris was traded by the Cubs to the New York Yankees for Dick Tidrow.
 June 26, 1979: Bobby Murcer was traded by the Cubs to the New York Yankees for Paul Semall (minors).
 August 17, 1979: Ted Sizemore was traded by the Cubs to the Boston Red Sox for a player to be named later and cash. The Red Sox completed the trade by sending Mike O'Berry to the Cubs on October 23, 1979.

Roster

Player stats

Batting

Starters by position 
Note: Pos = Position; G = Games played; AB = At bats; H = Hits; Avg. = Batting average; HR = Home runs; RBI = Runs batted in

Other batters 
Note: G = Games played; AB = At bats; H = Hits; Avg. = Batting average; HR = Home runs; RBI = Runs batted in

Pitching

Starting pitchers 
Note: G = Games pitched; IP = Innings pitched; W = Wins; L = Losses; ERA = Earned run average; SO = Strikeouts

Other pitchers 
Note: G = Games pitched; IP = Innings pitched; W = Wins; L = Losses; ERA = Earned run average; SO = Strikeouts

Relief pitchers 
Note: G = Games pitched; W = Wins; L = Losses; SV = Saves; ERA = Earned run average; SO = Strikeouts

Farm system 

LEAGUE CHAMPIONS: Quad Cities

Notes

References

External links 
1979 Chicago Cubs season at Baseball Reference

Chicago Cubs seasons
Chicago Cubs season
Chicago Cubs